Georg Argast (born 2 September 1899, date of death unknown) was a Swiss wrestler. He competed in the men's Greco-Roman light heavyweight at the 1936 Summer Olympics.

References

External links
 

1899 births
Year of death missing
Swiss male sport wrestlers
Olympic wrestlers of Switzerland
Wrestlers at the 1936 Summer Olympics
Place of birth missing